Demetera is a genus of flies in the family Dolichopodidae. It contains eight species formerly included in Medetera in the M. melanesiana species group. The species are found in the Afrotropical, Oriental and Australasian regions. According to Naglis and Bickel (2012), it was unwarranted to establish a separate genus for this group of species.

Species
 Demetera demeteri (Grichanov, 1997)
 Demetera kokodensis (Bickel, 1987)<ref name="Bickel1987a">{{cite journal|last1=Bickel|first1=Daniel J.|title=A revision of the Oriental and Australian  Medetera (Diptera: Dolichopodidae).|journal=Records of the Australian Museum|date=1987|volume=39|issue=4|pages=195–259|url=http://australianmuseum.net.au/uploads/journals/17676/170_complete.pdf|accessdate=22 December 2016|publisher=Australian Museum|location=Sydney|issn=0067-1975|doi=10.3853/j.0067-1975.39.1987.170}}</ref>
 Demetera macalpinei (Bickel, 1987)
 Demetera malaisei (Bickel, 1987)
 Demetera melanesiana (Bickel, 1987)
 Demetera morobensis (Bickel, 1987)
 Demetera niuginiensis (Bickel, 1987)
 Demetera rhetheura'' (Bickel, 1987)

References 

Dolichopodidae genera
Medeterinae